Agathis ovata, the mountain kauri, is a species of conifer, genus Agathis in the family Araucariaceae. It is found only on the southwest Pacific island of New Caledonia. It is threatened by habitat loss.

Habitat

Agathis ovata is found only in New Caledonia on montane scrubland or in forests, although it requires a high level of rainfall so is generally restricted to between 150 and 1000 metres. Agathis were once found worldwide, although species such as this are now becoming very restricted. Other members of this family, Araucariaceae, include Hoop Pine (Araucaria cunninghamii), Queensland Kauri (Agathis robusta) and Cook Pine (Araucaria columnaris), of which the former two are found in rainforests and the latter in coastal forests of New Caledonia. Although these trees are at no risk, Agathis ovata is at a high risk of extinction from logging of tall forest trees and mining activities which clear its habitat.

Description

It is a medium tree, growing to 25 metres tall with a straight trunk in forests, although on the scrubland where it is more common it is a large shrub or small tree, branching from the base upwards with a broad, flat, crown and 1–8 metres tall. The bark has deep fissures, and is normally whitish-tan on the outside and red-brown on the underside.

Gallery

References

ovata
Conservation dependent plants
Taxonomy articles created by Polbot